Correctional nursing or forensic nursing is nursing as it relates to prisoners. Nurses are required in prisons, jails and detention centers; their job is to provide physical and mental healthcare for detainees and inmates. In these correctional settings, nurses are the primary healthcare providers. These nurses also work with victims and assist in expert witness testimonies and are involved in a variety of legal cases including paternity disputes and workplace injuries.

Roles
Correctional facilities vary widely in size and population. Correspondingly, there is a wide range of roles which correctional nurses fill. Some facilities are as large as small cities and include an in-house hospital with inpatient and emergency facilities. Most correctional nurses fall into four categories: Reception Screening, Chronic Care Clinicians, Medication Administration, and Ambulatory Care (often called, "sick call").

Intake Screening
Intake Screening is often called, "R&R Screening" for, "Reception and Release". Generally, all inmate new to the institution are evaluated by a nurse prior to being installed into their housing unit. Custodial officers uses this information in order to decide which part of the facility is appropriate for housing, sometimes initiating movement to another facility if the inmate's medical or mental health needs cannot be met at the initial placement. The nurse performing intake screening generally schedules the inmate for an appointment with a healthcare provider for a detailed history and physical depending on the inmate's needs and presence of chronic diseases.

Chronic Care Clinicians
Inmates with chronic health care concerns (asthma, diabetes, high blood pressure, etc.) generally have regularly scheduled appointments in chronic care clinics. Nurses here provide patient assessments and education about chronic health concerns. Generally, these clinics are overseen by a physician or other mid level provider such as a nurse practitioner.

Medication Administration 
Medications, even over-the-counter ones, can be misused in a correctional environment. Most frequently, medications are administered to patients via a medication pass or queue system. At set, scheduled times during the day, inmates requiring medication either report to a nurse located centrally in a medical unit or receive their doses in their housing unit. In higher security areas, where patients are largely confined to cells and movement is more restricted, the medications are administered at cell front.

Nursing Sick Call
Inmates requiring episodic health care generally follow a process called Sick Call. After requesting treatments, generally by completing a form (a "Sick Call Slip"), a nurse meets with the inmate. Most facilities have standardized protocols for conditions like headache, athlete's foot, and constipation, which can be treated with over-the-counter medication without the need for an advanced medical provider such as a physician. An assessment of a more serious condition, or one that falls outside the protocols, would be referred to a medical provider for further evaluation.

Correctional Nursing & Mental Illness
According to the National Alliance of Mental Health reports in 2019 roughly 40% of all people with mental illness will be introduced to the criminal justice system (2 million). Of the inmates incarcerated in the many different types of facilities, 25% have mental illness (550,000 on any day). In 2017 State and Federal Governments paid more than $150 billion to incarcerate these individuals and their stays in the system are usually 4x longer than other patients.

Treating those patients is quite difficult. Prisons rely on security over healthcare, and expression of care from nurses is restricted due to budget limitations, patient restrictions and ethical unknowns. Making their care even more difficult is the fact that many inmates in correctional justice facilities have lost their rights and are limited in what they are allowed to receive and the measure of their care leading to a dehumanizing of patients.  Another main problem of nursing mental illness in correctional facilities is the overwhelming association with these patients and the likelihood they will end up in solitary confinement which compounds their mental status greatly.  Nurses training in the criminal justice system must be prepared for these problems in their daily practices.

Common Careers in Correctional Nursing 
When it comes to establishing a career in correctional/forensic nursing, there are many avenues one can undertake which can include sexual assault nurse examiner, forensic nurse examiner, nurse coroner, nurse attorney or a forensic nurse examiner.

Community Health--Prison Populations 
When one enters into a correctional facility, the presence of health care should not go away. The patients in prison populations are at a greater risk for health complications, especially if there are untreated, underlying chronic health conditions. Some of the most common health concerns for those in prison include communicable diseases including HIV, hepatitis and tuberculosis. These remain an issue for this population due to the prisoners engaging in high-risk behaviors including unprotected sexual contact. For the older adult prison population (considered aged 50 years and above in this subset), common chronic health conditions reported include diabetes, hypertension, arthritis, cancer and respiratory disorders including asthma and emphysema. 

For women in prison, there are more components that need to be considered to ensure their overall health. Also, with the common chronic conditions as listed above, there needs to be increased access to reproductive health services including gynecological exams.  There also needs to be improved mental health processes for women in prison. For some, there have been increased reports of self-harm and suicide while in prison when compared to the male prisoner demographic. The root causes of this issue is related to being isolated, being detained in locations away from loved ones and bullying from other prisoners. To further address these needs to eliminate this, there needs to be more adequate assessment screenings of the women prisoners including acknowledging any significant history of trauma as well as the offering of social support services.

References

Education and training occupations